Frank William Elford Blew (1902–1968) was a Welsh footballer who played as either a left-back or centre-forward for Wrexham and Llandudno in the 1920s. Blew also played for the Wales Amateur team. His father was Horace Blew, also a footballer who played at full-back for Wrexham, Manchester United, Manchester City and the Welsh national team.

Born in Wrexham, Blew began his career with his local club, Wrexham in 1921. He made five appearances in his first season, scoring one goal, before moving on to Llandudno in 1922. He returned to Wrexham a year later, but made seven appearances before going back to Llandudno in 1924. In 1925, he returned to Wrexham for the last time, making 16 appearances over two seasons before retiring in 1927.

After his retirement, Blew played a role in scouting young players for Wrexham, including Arfon Griffiths, who later played for Arsenal and made more than 550 appearances for Wrexham.

References

1902 births
1968 deaths
Footballers from Wrexham
Welsh footballers
Association football defenders
Association football forwards
Wrexham A.F.C. players
English Football League players
Llandudno F.C. players
Wales amateur international footballers